Penicillium aragonense is an anamorph fungus species of the genus of Penicillium.

See also
List of Penicillium species

References

Further reading
 

aragonense
Fungi described in 1981